Sterling Wescott (born January 30, 1972 in Aurora, Colorado) is a retired U.S. soccer midfielder who played in the USISL, National Professional Soccer League, World Indoor Soccer League, Major Indoor Soccer League and two games with D.C. United in Major League Soccer.  He has coached at the high school and professional levels.

Youth
Wescott grew up in Aurora, Colorado, attending Smoky Hill High School where he was a four year starter and three-time All State on the boys’ soccer team.  He graduated from high school in the spring of 1990 and entered Fresno State University that fall.  From 1990 to 1994, he played for the Fresno State Bulldogs soccer team.  He graduated in 1995 with a bachelor's degree in physical education and teaching.

Professional
In the summer of 1994, Wescott trained with F.C. Laufen, an amateur Swiss team.  He turned professional in 1995 with the Hawaii Tsunami of the USISL.  That fall, he signed with the Wichita Wings of the National Professional Soccer League (NPSL).  He remained with the Wings through the 1998-1999 season.  On February 7, 1996, D.C. United selected Wescott in the 14th round (140th overall) in the 1996 MLS Inaugural Player Draft.  He played two games with United, then was placed on waivers on May 3, 1996.  He then signed with the Hampton Roads Mariners of the USISL.  In the summer of 1997, he played for the Colorado Foxes of the USISL A-League.   From 1999 to 2000, Wescott played for the Utah Freezz in the World Indoor Soccer League.  In 2001, he signed with the Utah Blitzz of the USISL, winning the 2001 championship.  On July 23, 2003, the St. Louis Steamers of the Major Indoor Soccer League selected Wescott in the eighth round of the Expansion Draft.  He played for the Steamers until the folded following the 2005-2006 seasons.  In September 2006, the Chicago Storm selected Wescott in the fifth round of the 2006 MISL Dispersal Draft, but Wescott chose to retire and did not sign with the Storm.

Coach
Wescott’s coaching career began in 1993 when he joined the Clovis Soccer Club, a youth club in Clovis, California.  In 1994, he became the head coach of the Clovis West High School soccer team.  As he moved from team to team as a player, he would move to other clubs and high schools.  In 1997, he was an assistant coach with Smoky Hill High School, his alma mater.  In 1999, he entered the Olympic Development Program as a coach and evaluator, holding that position until 2003.  In 2004, he spent one season as the head coach of the St. Louis Strikers in the fourth division Premier Development League.  He is currently the Coaching Director for youth club Missouri Premier in St. Louis, Missouri.

References

External links
 Missouri Premier

1972 births
Living people
American soccer coaches
American soccer players
Colorado Foxes players
D.C. United players
Fresno State Bulldogs men's soccer players
Virginia Beach Mariners players
Hawaii Tsunami players
Major Indoor Soccer League (2001–2008) players
Major League Soccer players
National Professional Soccer League (1984–2001) players
Sportspeople from Clovis, California
St. Louis Steamers (1998–2006) players
St. Louis Strikers players
USISL players
Utah Blitzz players
Utah Freezz players
Wichita Wings (NPSL) players
World Indoor Soccer League players
Association football midfielders
Soccer players from Colorado